Gretel Sara Campi Pérez (born 20 January 1984) is a biologist and a retired footballer who played as a midfielder.

Born in Cuba, she moved to Ecuador and has been a member of the Ecuador women's national team.

International career
Campi played for Ecuador at senior level in two South American Women's Football Championship editions (2003 and 2006).

International goals
Scores and results list Ecuador's goal tally first

References

1984 births
Living people
Women's association football midfielders
Women biologists
Cuban women's footballers
Cuban biologists
Sportspeople from Havana

Naturalized citizens of Ecuador
Ecuadorian women's footballers
Ecuador women's international footballers
Ecuadorian biologists
Ecuadorian women scientists
21st-century Ecuadorian women